The England cricket team toured Australia in the 1936–37 season to play a five-match Test series against Australia for The Ashes. The tour was organised by the Marylebone Cricket Club and matches outside the Tests were played under the MCC name.

Australia won the series 3–2, having been 2–0 down, and therefore retained The Ashes. The 1936-37 Australia side are the only team to win a five-match series after losing the first two Tests, with Bradman being the only captain to win a five-match series after losing the first two Tests.

Test series summary

First Test

Second Test

Third Test

Fourth Test

Fifth Test

Ceylon and New Zealand
The English team had a stopover in Colombo en route to Australia and played a one-day single-innings match there against the Ceylon national team, which at that time did not have Test status.

At the end of the tour the team visited New Zealand, playing three first-class matches, but no Tests.

References

Sources
 CricketArchive tour itinerary

Annual reviews
 Wisden Cricketers' Almanack 1937

Further reading
 Bill Frindall, The Wisden Book of Test Cricket 1877–1978, Wisden, 1979
 Chris Harte, A History of Australian Cricket, Andre Deutsch, 1993
 Ray Robinson, On Top Down Under, Cassell, 1975

External links
 England in Australia, 1936-37 at Cricinfo
 Marylebone Cricket Club in Australia and New Zealand 1936/37 at CricketArchive
 England to Australia 1936-37 at Test Match Tours

1936 in English cricket
1936 in Australian cricket
1936 in Ceylon
1937 in English cricket
1937 in Australian cricket
1936-37
1936
Australian cricket seasons from 1918–19 to 1944–45
International cricket competitions from 1918–19 to 1945
Sri Lankan cricket seasons from 1880–81 to 1971–72
1936-37